The first elections to Tower Hamlets council were in 1964, in readiness for the Council coming into being in 1965. The first two elections were held every three years, and since 1974 elections have been held every four years.

From 1964 to 1978, the Council had 60 members, and ward boundaries remained constant, with none of the wards crossing the old Metropolitan Borough boundaries. The number of Councillors was reduced to 50 for the 1978 elections, and ward boundaries were changed; these borders remained in use until 2002. The ward boundaries changed for the 2002 elections, with all wards receiving 3 member seats, increasing the numbers of Councillors to 51.

Below are summary results of the elections from 1964 to 1990.

See also
 Tower Hamlets local elections

Council elections in the London Borough of Tower Hamlets
1964 English local elections
1968 English local elections
1971 English local elections
1974 English local elections
1978 English local elections
1982 English local elections
1986 English local elections
1990 English local elections
20th century in the London Borough of Tower Hamlets